Human gene HSPA1B is an intron-less gene which encodes for the heat shock protein HSP70-2, a member of the Hsp70 family of proteins. The gene is located in the major histocompatibility complex, on the short arm of chromosome 6, in a cluster with two paralogous genes, HSPA1A and HSPA1L. HSPA1A and HSPA1B produce nearly identical proteins because the few differences in their DNA sequences are almost exclusively synonymous substitutions or in the three prime untranslated region, heat shock 70kDa protein 1A, from HSPA1A, and heat shock 70kDa protein 1B, from HSPA1B. A third, more modified paralog to these genes exists in the same region, HSPA1L, which shares a 90% homology with the other two.

Function 
Heat shock 70kDa protein 1B is a chaperone protein, cooperating with other heat shock proteins and chaperone systems to maintain proteostasis by stabilizing the structural conformation of other proteins in the cell and protecting against stress-induced aggregation. Hsp70s have also been shown to bind and stabilize mRNA rich in adenine and uracil bases, independent of the occupational states of its other binding sites. This protein is deactivated by binding ATP, and activated by its dephosphorylation to ADP, which requires a potassium ion to facilitate the hydrolysis, or ATP-ADP exchange.

Hsp70-2 specifically is developmentally expressed in male germ line cells during meiosis, where it is necessary for the formation of the complex between CDC2 and cyclin B1. It later becomes incorporated into the CatSper complex, a specialized calcium ion channel that enables spermatozoa motility.

Clinical significance
Infertility has been observed in mice when HSA1B expression is disrupted, as CDC2 in unable to form the required heterodimer with cyclin B1 for the meiotic cell cycle to progress beyond S phase.

Expression of heat shock protein 70kDa protein 2 in transformed tumor cells has been implicated in the rapid proliferation, metastasis, and inhibition of apoptosis in ovarian, bladder urothelial, and breast cancers. Patients with chronic hepatitis B or hepatitis C virus infection who harbor a HSPA1B-1267 single nucleotide polymorphism have a higher risk for developing hepatocellular carcinoma.

Interactions 

Interactions have been characterized between Hsp70-2 and the following proteins:

ATF5,
BAG1,
BAG2,
BAG3,
CatSperβ,
CDC2,
CHCHD3,
DNAJC7,
DNAJC8,
DNAJC9,
FOXP3,
HDAC4,
HOPX,
HSP40,
HSP90,
HSP105,
IRAK1BP1,
METTL21A,
NAA10,
NEDD1,
NOD2,
PPP5C,
PKRN,
SMAD3,
STUB1,
TERT,
TRIM5,
TSC2,

See also 
Heat shock proteins
Hsp70

References

External links 
 

Heat shock proteins